Forward–center or bigman is a basketball position for players who play or have played both forward and center on a consistent basis. Typically, this means power forward and center, since these are usually the two biggest player positions on any basketball team, and therefore more often overlap each other.

Forward–center came into the basketball jargon as the game evolved and became more specialized in the 1960s. The five positions on court were originally known only as guards, forwards, and the center, but it is now generally accepted that the five primary positions are point guard, shooting guard, small forward, power forward, and center.

Typically, a forward–center is a talented forward who also came to play minutes at center on teams that need help at that position. The player could also be a somewhat floor-bound center, under seven feet tall at the NBA level, whose skills suit him to a power forward position, especially if that team has a better center. One such player is Marcus Camby of the New York Knicks. At 6′ 11″ (211 cm), he generally plays as a center, but when he played for the New York Knicks earlier in his career, he mostly played power forward because his team had one of the best pure centers in the league in 7′ 0″ (213 cm) Patrick Ewing. Ewing himself was used as a forward-center early in his career to complement the then-incumbent Knicks center, 7′ 1″ (216 cm) Bill Cartwright. Fellow Knicks legend Willis Reed was moved to the forward–center position when the team acquired fellow center Walt Bellamy in 1965; Reed moved back to center in 1968 after the Knicks traded Bellamy to the Detroit Pistons for Dave DeBusschere. Ralph Sampson, at 7′ 4″ (224 cm), was another notable forward–center who played center his rookie year in 1983. In 1984, he moved to power forward when 7′ 0″ (213 cm) Hakeem Olajuwon was drafted that year. Most forward-centers range from 6′ 9″ (2.06 m) to 7′ 0″ (2.13 m) in height.

Other notable forward-centers include: Kevin Garnett, Tim Duncan, Pau Gasol, Chris Bosh, LaMarcus Aldridge, Anthony Davis, Al Horford, Bam Adebayo, and Giannis Antetokounmpo.

See also
 Tweener

References 

Basketball positions
Basketball terminology